This is a timeline of web browsers from the early 1990s to the present. Prior to browsers, many technologies and systems existed for information viewing and transmission. For an in-depth history of earlier web browsers, see the web browser article.

Graphical timeline

Timeline

1990s 
The following table chronicles the major release dates during the 1990s for the more popular web browsers.

2000s 
The following table chronicles the major release dates during the 2000s for the more popular web browsers.

2010s 
The following table chronicles the major release dates during the 2010s for the more popular web browsers.

2020s 
The following table chronicles the major release dates during the 2020s for the more popular web browsers.

 * Initial release
 † No subsequent releases are planned

References

External links
 Eric A. Meyer's take on a timeline structure for historical browsers
 Fresh-browsers.com displays the history of major web browsers
 Google Chrome team's The Evolution of the Web

Web browsers
Web browsers
History of web browsers
Software version histories